Split at the Root: An Essay on Jewish Identity is a 1982 essay by American poet and activist Adrienne Rich. The poem explores Rich's patrilineal Jewish heritage and her maternal Protestant heritage, as well as issues of Jewish identity, antisemitism, racism, whiteness, class, the Holocaust, and Jewish assimilation.

About
The essay explores Rich's complicated identity as the daughter of a white Jewish father of Ashkenazi and Sephardi heritage and a white Episcopalian mother, both of whom had Southern roots. Rich acknowledges that she cannot be considered Jewish according to traditional halakha (Jewish religious law) nor would she be considered Jewish under her own lesbian-feminist theory that places primacy on maternal inheritance, but nonetheless refers to herself as a Jewish lesbian "raised to be a heterosexual gentile". The term "Split at the root" comes from a 1960 poem she wrote where she refers to herself as "Split at the root, neither Gentile nor Jew,/Yankee nor Rebel." Her father was born in Birmingham, Alabama and her mother was a "white Southern Protestant" from Wilmington, North Carolina.

See also
Who is a Jew?

References

External links
Split at the Root: An Essay on Jewish Identity, Arizona State University

Ashkenazi Jewish culture in Baltimore
Feminist essays
Jewish American literature
Jewish feminism
Jews and Judaism in Baltimore
Works about LGBT and Judaism
Lesbian feminist literature
Secular Jewish culture in the United States
Sephardi Jewish culture in Maryland
Southern United States literature
White American culture in Baltimore
Works about antisemitism
Works about racism
Works about social class
Works by Adrienne Rich